Coptotomus is a genus of predaceous diving beetles in the family Dytiscidae, the only genus of the subfamily Coptotominae. There are about six described species in Coptotomus, found in North America and the Neotropics.

There is one extinct species from the Palearctic.

Species
These six species belong to the genus Coptotomus:
 †Coptotomus balticus Hendrich and Balke, 2020
 Coptotomus difficilis LeConte, 1852
 Coptotomus interrogatus (Fabricius, 1801)
 Coptotomus longulus LeConte, 1852
 Coptotomus loticus Hilsenhoff, 1980
 Coptotomus serripalpus Say, 1830
 Coptotomus venustus (Say, 1823)

References

Further reading

 
 

Dytiscidae genera